The Skadar gudgeon (Gobio skadarensis) is a species of gudgeon, a small freshwater in the family Cyprinidae. It is found in the Lake Skadar basin in Montenegro and Albania.

References

 

Gobio
Fish described in 1937
Taxa named by Stanko Karaman
Freshwater fish of Europe